Acy-en-Multien is a commune in the Oise department in northern France.

Population

See also
 Communes of the Oise department
 Claude Gensac

References

Communes of Oise